This is a list of notable converts to Christianity from Hinduism.

List

See also
 List of converts to Hinduism from Christianity

References

 Hinduism
Christianity from Hinduism
Hinduism-related lists